Stadio Comunale Romeo Menti is a football stadium in Castellammare di Stabia, Italy.  It is currently the home ground of S.S. Juve Stabia.  The stadium holds 12,800 and was opened in 1984.

Romeo Menti
S.S. Juve Stabia